The grey hypocolius or simply hypocolius (Hypocolius ampelinus) is a small passerine bird species. It is the sole member of the genus Hypocolius and it is placed in a family of its own, the Hypocoliidae. This slender and long tailed bird is found in the dry semi-desert region of northern Africa, Arabia, Afghanistan, Pakistan, and western India. They fly in flocks and forage mainly on fruits, migrating south in winter.

Description
The grey hypocolius is a slim bird with a long tail, slight crest and thick, short hook-tipped bill. Its shape and soft, satiny plumage resembles that of the waxwing. Birds are mainly a uniform grey or brownish-grey colour, with males having a black triangular mask around the eyes. They have white-tipped black primary wing feathers and a black terminal band on the tail. Adults are about 19–21 cm in length.

The head feathers are raised when the bird is excited. They fly in a straight non-undulating style and when hopping in shrubbery, can appear like a babbler. The tarsus is short and sturdy with coarse scales. There are rictal bristles visible at the base of the bill and the nostrils are exposed, small and oval.

Taxonomy
The relationships of the species were formerly unclear. Earlier authors had suggested that they were related to the bulbuls or shrikes. They appear to be related to the waxwings, and at least one study based on molecular sequences suggests that it belongs to the same group. A 2019 study found them to be in a clade containing the palmchat (Dulidae), waxwings (Bombycillidae), silky-flycatchers (Ptiliogonatidae), hylocitrea (Hylocitreidae), and the extinct Hawaiian honeyeaters (Mohoidae), with Hypocoliidae being a sister group to the Mohoidae (with both diverging about 15-20 mya during the early-mid Miocene), and the clade containing Mohoidae and Hypocoliidae being sister to Hylocitreidae, which diverged slightly earlier in the Miocene.

Distribution and habitat
The grey hypocolius ranges through the Middle East, breeding in the Iraq, Iran, Afghanistan, Pakistan, Turkmenistan area, and wintering mostly near the Red Sea and Persian Gulf coasts of Arabia, including Bahrain. It is a vagrant to Turkey, Israel, Egypt and Oman. They are regular winter visitors to the Kutch region of western India and vagrants have been noted as far south as Kihim near Bombay. It is found in woodland and scrub in arid and semiarid regions, especially river valleys near deserts, as well as in irrigated and cultivated areas with trees, such as palm groves and gardens.

Behaviour

The grey hypocolius is a shy and unobtrusive, even cryptic, bird which will fly to thick cover when disturbed, where it will remain motionless until the perceived danger has passed. Its flight is strong and direct (without undulations). It will form flocks, especially in winter, and roost communally.

Breeding

The breeding season is June or July in Arabia. The nest is cup shaped and deep lined with hair and fluff. The nest is often placed on the leaves of a date palm at a height of about 3 to 5 feet. Both the male and female take part in nest building. The clutch is four eggs. The eggs are leaden white with blotches.  The incubation period is about 14–15 days.

Feeding
Grey hypocoliuses forage quietly and methodically in foliage, through clusters of trees, palm groves and orchards, rarely coming to the ground. Though they may eat some insects, their main diet consists of fruits and berries, including mulberries, figs and dates. In captivity they have been known to readily take bread.

Calls
The most common vocalization is a series of squealing descending notes or kleeeu whistles. Other calls include scolding chirps.

Conservation
Because the species has a large range, and because it does not meet the population size and decline criteria of the IUCN Red List, the conservation status is evaluated as being of "least concern".  Because of its monotypic family status it is much sought after by birdwatchers.

Gallery

References

External links

Hypocolius birding info and photos
 Hypocolius videos, photos & sounds on the Internet Bird Collection

grey hypocolius
Birds of Western Asia
Birds of the Middle East
grey hypocolius
grey hypocolius
Extant Miocene first appearances
Articles containing video clips